Love Story is the twenty-seventh studio album by American pop singer Andy Williams that was released on February 3, 1971, by Columbia Records. This was another in his series of cover albums, but the title track, subtitled "Where Do I Begin", was the one song included that he originated.

The album made its first appearance on the Top LP's chart in the issue of  Billboard magazine dated February 20, 1971, and remained there for 33 weeks, peaking at number three.  One month later, on March 22, the album received Gold certification from the Recording Industry Association of America, and Platinum certification was awarded on November 21, 1986.  For its release in the UK, the album was entitled Home Lovin' Man and did not include the title song from the original album (which was subtitled "Where Do I Begin?"), and this retitled edition entered the UK album chart on March 27, 1971, and spent two weeks at number one during its 26 weeks there. The title track from the original album was included on a UK LP that was also called Love Story but otherwise had a completely different set of songs, and that release entered the UK album chart on July 31 of that year and reached number 11 over the course of 11 weeks.

The first single from the original Love Story album was, in fact, "(Where Do I Begin) Love Story", which entered the Billboard Hot 100 in the issue of the magazine dated February 6, 1971, and stayed on the chart for 13 weeks, eventually peaking at number nine.  The song also entered the magazine's list of the 40 most popular Easy Listening songs of the week in that same issue for its first of 15 weeks, later spending four weeks at number one and tying his previous record there, which was set by "Can't Get Used to Losing You" in 1963.  Its lifespan on the UK singles chart began on March 20 of that same year and lasted 18 weeks, during which time it reached number four. The first single from the Home Lovin' Man LP was that album's title track, which began a seven-week run to number 10 and back on the Easy Listening chart in the US on October 24, 1970.  Although it did not make the pop chart stateside, it did enter the UK singles chart on November 21, 1970, and got as high as number seven during its 12 weeks there.

The original Love Story album was released on compact disc for the first time by Columbia Records in 1988.  A Columbia 3-CD box set including this album along with Andy Williams' Greatest Hits and Andy Williams' Greatest Hits Vol. 2 was released on August 12, 1997.

Reception

Shawn M. Haney of Allmusic gave the album an enthusiastic review. "This is a precious feast to enjoy of delightful '70s love songs, sung and performed with sincerity by beloved pop singer talent Andy Williams." He had especially high praise for the vocalist. "Williams gives all of his soul and heart to pull off some stirring renditions of the amiable type to the kind listener." He also appreciated the production team. "Dick Glasser gives much of his time as producer in finding Andy Williams's unique sound, with Artie Butler and Dick Hazard playing a splendid role in the arrangements." He adds, "A wistful breath of fresh air away from the takeover of entertainers Frank Sinatra and Neil Diamond, the record is a pleasant listening experience for those who appreciate romantic ballads and melancholy orchestra background music. This collection shows just how easy it came to cover love ballads and pop hits in the '70s, giving Williams and his dazzling entertainer style voice the right time to shine during his days of stardom. So turn your lights down low and get with the one you share dreams with, and be prepared to feel the love."

Billboard magazine summed up their opinion in a capsule review that said, "A nifty assortment and beautifully done."

Track listing

Side one
 "(Where Do I Begin) Love Story" (Francis Lai, Carl Sigman) – 3:10
 "Your Song" (Elton John, Bernie Taupin) – 3:27
 "For the Good Times" (Kris Kristofferson) – 3:37
 "Something" (George Harrison) – 3:01
 "It's Impossible" (Armando Manzanero, Sid Wayne) – 2:47
 "We've Only Just Begun" (Roger Nichols, Paul Williams) – 3:15

Side two
 "I Think I Love You" (Tony Romeo) – 2:42
 "Candida" (Irwin Levine, Toni Wine) – 3:38
 "Fire and Rain" (James Taylor) – 3:36
 "Rose Garden" (Joe South) – 2:31
 "My Sweet Lord" (George Harrison) – 4:14

For the Home Lovin' Man album in the UK, "(Where Do I Begin) Love Story" was replaced with the title track, but the remaining 10 songs followed the same order listed.

Song information

Elton John got as high as number eight pop, number nine Easy Listening, and number seven on the UK singles chart with "Your Song". "For the Good Times" earned Ray Price a week at number one on the Billboard Country singles chart, peak positions at number nine Easy Listening and number 11 pop, and the Grammy for Best Country Vocal Performance, Male. By the time Williams had released this album The Beatles had received Gold certification from the Recording Industry Association of America for "Something", spent a week with the song at number one on the Billboard Hot 100, and made it to number 17 Easy Listening and number four UK.
 
Perry Como's "It's Impossible" spent four weeks at number one on the Easy Listening chart and peaked at number 10 pop and number four UK. The Carpenters earned a Gold record for "We've Only Just Begun" and spent four weeks at number two pop and seven weeks at number one Easy Listening in addition to reaching number 28 UK. Another Gold record covered here is The Partridge Family's "I Think I Love You", which enjoyed three weeks at number one on the Billboard Hot 100 and made it to number eight Easy Listening and number 18 UK. Gold certification was also bestowed upon "Candida", which went to number three pop, number eight Easy Listening, and number nine UK for Dawn, the group that eventually became known as Tony Orlando and Dawn.

"Fire and Rain" had its biggest chart success as a recording by James Taylor that reached number three on the Hot 100, number seven Easy Listening,  and number 42 UK. "Rose Garden" took Lynn Anderson to number one on the Country chart for five weeks, number five Easy Listening, number three pop, and number three UK, and awarded her with Gold certification and the Grammy Award for Best Country Vocal Performance, Female. Also in 1971, a cover version by the Australian group New World reached number 15 on the UK Singles Chart. George Harrison's recording of "My Sweet Lord" made it to number one pop for four weeks, number 10 Easy Listening, and number one UK for five weeks while earning Gold certification from the RIAA.

Charts

Personnel
From the liner notes for the original album:

Andy Williams - vocals
Dick Glasser - producer
Artie Butler - arranger (except as noted)
Dick Hazard - arranger ("(Where Do I Begin?) Love Story")
Peter Romano - engineer
Rafael O. Valentin - engineer
Anne Blackford - cover design
Guy Webster - cover photos

References

Bibliography

1971 albums
Andy Williams albums
Albums arranged by Richard Hazard
Albums produced by Dick Glasser
Columbia Records albums